Historia naturalis bulgarica is a peer-reviewed international scientific journal, published by the National Museum of Natural History, Sofia, Bulgaria. 

The journal is being published as of 1989, and as of 2018 is published only electronically. The journal published scientific contributions on paleontology, zoology, botany, geology and mineralogy, as well as original articles on history of natural sciences and natural history institutions. The papers are published in English language only under the free license CC BY 4.0.

Editorial board 
Editor-in-Chief is Stanislav Abadjiev, and the members of the Editorial Board are Boyan Zlatkov, Georgi N. Markov, Mario Langurov, Nikolay Simov, Peter Shurulinkov, Vladislav Vergilov, Christo Deltshev, Fedor V. Konstantinov, Giancarlo Statti, Ljiljana Tomović, Peter Huemer, Peter Jäger, Richard Gemel, Rossen Tzonev, Snejana Grozeva.

Indexing 
As of June 2021, Historia naturalis bulgarica is indexed in the  Crossref, Directory of Open Access Journals (DOAJ), Index Copernicus International World of Journals, Scopus, Web of Science (Zoological Record).

Index descriptus 

The journal maintains an "Index descriptus" representing a list of newly described organisms, new subspecies, species and a genus, whose descriptions appear for the first time on the pages of Historia naturalis bulgarica. As of October 2020, the list contains 53 taxa, geographically located in Albania, Antarctica, Bulgaria, China, Cuba, France, Greece, Iceland, Mexico, Nepal, Nigeria, North Korea, Papua New Guinea, Tunisia, Turkey.

References 

Academic journals of Bulgaria
Zoology journals
Botany journals
Paleontology journals
Geology journals
English-language journals
Publications established in 1989
Creative Commons Attribution-licensed journals